Nyika is a Swahili word meaning "bush" or "hinterland" (of the East African coast). More specifically, it can refer to:

 Mijikenda peoples, nine ethnic groups in coastal Kenya (also: Wanyika)
 Nyika language, a Bantu language of Tanzania and Zambia
 Nyika National Park, Malawi
 Nyika National Park, Zambia
 Nyika Plateau, Malawi and Zambia
 Nyiri Desert, Kenya
 Sabaki languages, Bantu languages of the Central East African coast

Language and nationality disambiguation pages